Blepephaeus agenor is a species of beetle in the family Cerambycidae. It was described by Newman in 1842, originally under the genus Monohammus. It is known from the Philippines.

References

Blepephaeus
Beetles described in 1842